Meykhvaran-e Pain or Meykhvoran-e Pain or Meykhowran-e Pain may refer to:
 Meykhvaran-e Mohammad Aqa
 Meykhvaran-e Mohammad Sadeq